Rickelle Smith (born 17 January 1986) is a former Bermudian woman cricketer. She has played for Bermuda at the 2008 Women's Cricket World Cup Qualifier.

References

External links 

1986 births
Living people
Bermudian women cricketers